A ring is a round band, usually made of metal, worn as ornamental jewelry. The term "ring" by itself always denotes jewellery worn on the finger; when worn as an ornament elsewhere, the body part is specified within the term, e.g., earrings, neck rings, arm rings, and toe rings. Rings always fit snugly around or in the part of the body they ornament, so bands worn loosely, like a bracelet, are not rings. Rings may be made of almost any hard material: wood, bone, stone, metal, glass, gemstone or plastic. They may be set with gemstones (diamond, ruby, sapphire or emerald) or with other types of stone or glass.

Although some people wear rings as mere ornaments or as conspicuous displays of wealth, rings have symbolic functions respecting marriage, exceptional achievement, high status or authority, membership in an organization, and the like. Rings can be made to sport insignia which may be impressed on a wax seal or outfitted with a small compartment in which to conceal things.

History

Ancient India

Rings and other types of jewelry including necklaces, bracelets, earrings, bangles and pendants have been discovered from the 3rd millennium BC Indus Valley civilization. Factories of small beads have been discovered in Lothal, India.

Ancient Near East
Rings have been found in tombs in Ur dating back to circa 2500 BC. The Hittite civilization produced rings, including signet rings, only a few of which have been discovered. People in Old Kingdom Egypt wore a variety of rings, of which a few examples have been found, including the famous scarab design. Rings became more common during the Egyptian Middle Kingdom, containing increasingly complex designs. Egyptians made not only metal rings but rings from faience, some of which were used as new year gifts. Native styles were superseded by Greek and Roman fashions during the Ptolemaic dynasty.

Archaic and classical Greek
Archaic Greek rings were to some extent influenced by Egyptian rings, although they tended to be less substantial and were not generally used as working signet rings. As gold was not locally available, rings made in the eastern colonies tended to be made from silver and bronze, while Etruscans used gold.

The classical period showed a shift away from bronze to a wider adoption of silver and gold. The most typical design of the period involved a lozenge bezel mounting an intaglio device. Over time, the bezel moved towards a more circular form.

Roman Rings

During the early and middle imperial era (first two centuries AD), a typical Roman ring consisted of a thick hoop that tapered directly into a slightly wider bezel. An engraved oval gem would be embedded within the bezel with the top of the gem only rising slightly above the surrounding ring material. Such rings are known as Henig II and III/Guiraud 2 in formal academic parlance or simply as Roman rings to modern jewellers. In general, Roman rings became more elaborate in the third and fourth centuries AD.

High and Late Middle Ages in Europe

During this period, it was fashionable for several rings to be worn on each hand and each finger. Rings during this period were mostly made from copper-based alloys, silver or gold. Gems became common after 1150, along with the belief that certain gems had the power to help or protect the wearer in various ways. Engraved rings were produced using 
Lombardic script until around 1350, when it was replaced by Gothic script. Some of the inscriptions were devotional, others romantic in nature. For romantic inscriptions, French was the language of choice. An increasing use of contracts and other documents requiring formal seals meant that signet rings became more important from the 13th century onwards.

Ring location 

Each finger had a symbolic association or meaning (most of which were lost in antiquity and varied with culture) for the placement of a ring, significant to observers.

The fourth digit or ring finger of the left hand has become the customary place to wear betrothal, engagement and wedding rings in much of the world, though in certain countries the right hand finger is used. This custom was practically established as norm during World War II.

The use of the fourth finger of the left hand (the 'ring finger') is associated with an old belief that the left hand's ring finger is connected by a vein directly to the heart: the vena amoris, or vein of love. This idea was in vogue in the 16th and 17th century England, when Henry Swinburne referred to it in his book about marriage. It can be traced to ancient Rome, when Aulus Gellius cited Appianus as saying that the ancient Egyptians had found a fine nerve linking the fourth finger to the heart.

Occasionally rings have been re-purposed to hang from bracelets or necklaces.

The signet ring is traditionally worn on the left pinky or little finger.

A birthstone ring and/or "birthday" stone ring is customarily worn on the first finger of the right hand and indicates respectively the month and day of the week in and on which the bearer was born.

Amulet rings, meaningful for various purposes from protection (pentacle rings) to augmenting personal attributes (wisdom, confidence, social status etc.), are worn on various fingers, often depending on the intent of the ring's design or attributes of the stone inset. Although it has been thought that amulet rings worn on specific fingers for specific purposes enhanced their powers, most people simply wear them on any finger on which they fit.

Thumb rings were originally worn to protect the thumb from injuries caused by the launching of arrows and are a sign of an archer.

Size

While the ISO standard defines ring size in terms of the inner circumference (measured in millimeters), various countries still use traditional sizing systems. Sizing beads, which functionally reduce the ring size, are small metal beads added to the inner surface of a ring to hold it in place against the finger; they have the advantage of being easily added or removed.

Styles
After several thousand years of ring manufacture, the total number of styles produced is vast. Even cataloging the rings of a single civilization, such as the Romans, presents a major challenge. As a result, the following list should be considered to be very limited.

Notable individual rings

 Iffland-Ring, held by a series of German-language actors since the 18th century, presently held by German actor Jens Harzer
 Hans-Reinhart-Ring, a Swiss theatre award
 Ring of the Fisherman, the signet ring of the Pope
 Chequers Ring – a ring that belonged to Elizabeth I of England

In myth and fiction
 Ring of Gyges, a legendary ring of invisibility, mentioned by Plato
 Andvaranaut, in Norse mythology, a cursed ring that can make gold
 Magic ring, a ring that has magical properties
 Draupnir, a self-multiplying gold ring depicted in Norse mythology
 The One Ring, from J. R. R. Tolkien's The Hobbit and The Lord of the Rings, one of the Rings of Power

Safety

Wearing a ring can in some cases be a safety concern, when the ring is made of a material stronger than the hand, fully encircles the digit, and catches onto an immovable object. This can result in serious injury (degloving), amputation, or ring avulsion. Some recommend specifically not to use a ring while operating machinery or playing sports.

If a ring catches on rotating machinery, or the ring of a falling person catches on a stationary object, the wearer may suffer injury. For these reasons, some workplaces require employees to remove their rings temporarily while performing certain tasks or when in certain areas of a workplace. Despite the ring's symbolic appeal as a solid band around the finger, modern jewelers are sometimes known to modify rings such that, at worst, they only tear the flesh of the wearer's finger in cases like those above-mentioned. Such "breakaway" modifications have not yet achieved popularity as standard designs.

If the area near a ring is injured, the ring is removed immediately, before the injury starts to swell. Pulling rings off forcefully may worsen the swelling. Relaxation, elevation, icing, lubrication, and rotating the ring as if unscrewing it may help. If these methods don't work, it may be possible to remove the ring by temporarily wrapping the finger with a slick string (something like dental floss), passing the inner end of the thread under the ring, and then unwrapping it, pushing the ring ahead of the unwrapping string. Failing that, a doctor may remove it by other methods.

Other types
 Arm rings
 Earring
 Kakute
 Neck rings
 Pinky ring

See also

Jewellery cleaning
Metal casting
Ring of O
Seal of Solomon (Solomon's ring, a.k.a. ring of Solomon)
Smart ring
Titanium ring

References

External links

Types of jewellery
 
Fingers